New Valley Governorate or El Wadi El Gedid Governorate  is one of the governorates of Egypt. It is in the southwestern part of the country, in the south of Egypt Western Desert (part of the Sahara Desert), between the Nile, northern Sudan, and southeastern Libya. 

Consisting of roughly half of Egypt's area, this spacious governorate is the country's largest and most sparsely populated, and one of the biggest subnational divisions on the African continent, as well as the world. At 440,098 square kilometers in area, New Valley Governorate is just slightly larger than the country of Iraq. The capital is at the Kharga Oasis. New Valley Governate is named after the New Valley Project, which aims to irrigate parts of the Western Desert.

Municipal divisions									
The governorate is divided into municipal divisions with a total estimated population as of July 2017 of 242,300. In the case of New Valley governorate, there is one kism with urban and rural parts, and four marakiz.									

In an effort to decentralize the administration of Kharga, it was divided into four sections effective 19 June, 2018.

Population
According to population estimates, in 2015 the majority of residents in the governorate lived in rural areas, with an urbanization rate of only 48.0%. Out of an estimated 225,416 people residing in the governorate, 117,180 people lived in rural areas and only 108,236 lived in urban areas.

According to population estimates, in 2018 the population was 245,000,  with an urbanization rate of 46.7%.

Cities, towns, oases
New Valley has a number of cities, towns and oases. As of 2018, Kharga Oasis, and Dakhla Oasis were the two places in New Valley with a population of over 15,000. Farafra Oasis and Baris Oasis are also in New Valley.

Industrial zones
According to the Egyptian Governing Authority for Investment and Free Zones (GAFI), in affiliation with the Ministry of Investment (MOI), the following industrial zones are located in this governorate:
Al Kharga
Heavy industrial zone - El Dakhla 
Heavy industrial zone - Wadi Waer West
New Valley also contains some farming areas created by the New Valley project, like Sharq El Owainat.

History
2011 Egyptian revolution
Violent clashes were reported in the New Valley Governorate on February 8–9, 2011 as part of the 2011 Egyptian revolution. Protesters set fire to police stations and the National Democratic Party building. Multiple deaths were reported in addition to hundreds of injuries amid claims that the police opened fire on protesters in Kharga Oasis with live ammunition.

Industry 
 Farming of dates
 Tourism and safaris
 Agricultural activities (around oases)

See also 

 Gilf Kebir
 New Valley Project

References

External links 
 El Watan News of New Valley Governorate 

 
Governorates of Egypt